In the analysis of algorithms, the master theorem for divide-and-conquer recurrences provides an asymptotic analysis (using Big O notation) for recurrence relations of types that occur in the analysis of many divide and conquer algorithms. The approach was first presented by Jon Bentley, Dorothea Blostein (née Haken), and James B. Saxe in 1980, where it was described as a "unifying method" for solving such recurrences. The name "master theorem" was popularized by the widely-used algorithms textbook Introduction to Algorithms by Cormen, Leiserson, Rivest, and Stein. 

Not all recurrence relations can be solved with the use of this theorem; its generalizations include the Akra–Bazzi method.

Introduction 
Consider a problem that can be solved using a recursive algorithm such as the following:

 procedure p(input x of size n):
     if n < some constant k:
         Solve x directly without recursion
     else:
         Create a subproblems of x, each having size n/b
         Call procedure p recursively on each subproblem
         Combine the results from the subproblems

The above algorithm divides the problem into a number of subproblems recursively, each subproblem being of size . Its solution tree has a node for each recursive call, with the children of that node being the other calls made from that call. The leaves of the tree are the base cases of the recursion, the subproblems (of size less than k) that do not recurse. The above example would have  child nodes at each non-leaf node. The total amount of work done by the entire algorithm is the sum of the work performed by all the nodes in the tree. 

The runtime of an algorithm such as the 'p' above on an input of size 'n', usually denoted , can be expressed by the recurrence relation

where  is the time to create the subproblems and combine their results in the above procedure. This equation can be successively substituted into itself and expanded to obtain an expression for the total amount of work done. The master theorem allows many recurrence relations of this form to be converted to Θ-notation directly, without doing an expansion of the recursive relation.

Generic form 

The master theorem always yields asymptotically tight bounds to recurrences from divide and conquer algorithms that partition an input into smaller subproblems of equal sizes, solve the subproblems recursively, and then combine the subproblem solutions to give a solution to the original problem. The time for such an algorithm can be expressed by adding the work that they perform at the top level of their recursion (to divide the problems into subproblems and then combine the subproblem solutions) together with the time made in the recursive calls of the algorithm. If  denotes the total time for the algorithm on an input of size , and  denotes the amount of time taken at the top level of the recurrence then the time can be expressed by a recurrence relation that takes the form:

The theorem below also assumes that, as a base case for the recurrence,  when  is less than some bound , the smallest input size that will lead to a recursive call.

Recurrences of this form often satisfy one of the three following regimes, based on how the work to split/recombine the problem  relates to the critical exponent . (The table below uses standard big O notation).

A useful extension of Case 2 handles all values of :

Examples

Case 1 example 

As one can see from the formula above:

, so
, where 

Next, we see if we satisfy the case 1 condition:
.

It follows from the first case of the master theorem that

Case 2 example 

As we can see in the formula above the variables get the following values:

 where 
Next, we see if we satisfy the case 2 condition:

So it follows from the second case of the master theorem:

 

Case 3 example 

As we can see in the formula above the variables get the following values:

, where 

Next, we see if we satisfy the case 3 condition:
, and therefore, yes, 

The regularity condition also holds:

, choosing 

So it follows from the third case of the master theorem:

Inadmissible equations
The following equations cannot be solved using the master theorem:

a is not a constant; the number of subproblems should be fixed

 cannot have less than one sub problem

, which is the combination time, is not positive

case 3 but regularity violation.

It is clear that  for any constant . Therefore, the difference is not polynomial and the basic form of the Master Theorem does not apply. The extended form (case 2b) does apply, giving the solution .

Application to common algorithms

See also

 Akra–Bazzi method
 Asymptotic complexity

Notes

References 
 Thomas H. Cormen, Charles E. Leiserson, Ronald L. Rivest, and Clifford Stein. Introduction to Algorithms, Second Edition. MIT Press and McGraw–Hill, 2001. . Sections 4.3 (The master method) and 4.4 (Proof of the master theorem), pp. 73–90.
 Michael T. Goodrich and Roberto Tamassia. Algorithm Design: Foundation, Analysis, and Internet Examples. Wiley, 2002. . The master theorem (including the version of Case 2 included here, which is stronger than the one from CLRS) is on pp. 268–270.

Asymptotic analysis
Theorems in computational complexity theory
Recurrence relations
Analysis of algorithms